Digital Taylorism, also known as New Taylorism, is a modern take on the management style known as classic Taylorism or scientific management.  Digital Taylorism is based on maximizing efficiency by standardizing and routinizing the tools and techniques for completing each task involved with a given job.  Digital Taylorism involves management's use of technology to monitor workers and make sure they are employing these tools and techniques at a satisfactory level.

History of Taylorism/scientific management 

Taylorism, also known as scientific management, is a theory of management that analyzed how workers should be motivated. The theory was developed by Frederick Winslow Taylor beginning in the 1880s. The main goal of Taylorism is to increase efficiency by focusing on the task at hand. Taylor's main goal was to give employees the tools they needed in order to eliminate wastefulness. This approach to management is micro-focused on production. Scientific management emerged in response to the Industrial Revolution and the need for faster production. Taylorism is based on the assumptions that workers are inherently lazy, uneducated, and are only motivated by money.

Under Taylorism, the role of the manager is to break down tasks and give specific instructions to workers, who must have the right tools in order to do their job. In turn, workers only role is to do exactly as they are told and fill whatever quota they are given. The pros of this approach to management are that Taylorism opens the door to incredible advances by breaking down complex tasks into simple ones. It created major improvements in tools, and also increased efficiency in dealing with raw materials. On the other hand, the cons of scientific management are that it takes away worker's control over their own body, workplace, and tools; they are made into a mere machine. Workers under this system also have no sense of contribution to the whole.

Characteristics
Digital Taylorism is the theory of the new form of Taylorism resulting from the innovations introduced in the organization of work by digital techniques.

This theory was exposed for the first time in December 1996 in an article in the Rifondazione magazine entitled Cybernetic Egemony. For a critical history of digital technology by Sergio Bellucci, who fully elaborates it in the book E-Work. Work, network, innovation published in 2005.

Taylorism, the scientific organization of work proposed in 1911 by Frederick Winslow Taylor, provides for a decomposition of human work into three phases: the division of tasks, cooperation between the various broken parts and their control. The introduction of digital techniques does not eliminate this subdivision but enhances its capacity in all three phases: fragmentation becomes more efficient, cooperation more flexible and control more pervasive. The advent of digital technologies, which had made many theorists speak of post-Taylorism or post-Fordism or even post-industrialism, makes the new industrial production capacity more pervasive and extendable to many human activities that previously were not industrializable, applying the ability to scientifically organize work also to information and communication flows which become the heart of the new production planning.

The technological revolution introduced by the advent of digital has caused much talk of the overcoming of the history of industrial production. Theorists were divided on the definition of this transformation announcing the end of the Taylorist-Fordist phase of production. Post-Fordism, post-Taylorism, post-industrialism are some of the dozens of definitions that have appeared in the elaborations of many researchers. In 1998, with some articles in the newspaper Liberazione and in the monthly Rifondazione, Sergio Bellucci proposed the category of "digital Taylorism" as the enrichment of the potential of the scientific organization of work theorized by Taylor through digital technologies. The new productive sphere is characterized on the one hand by maintaining the decomposition of the cycle according to the suggestions indicated by Taylorism (parcelisation, cooperation and control), but these aspects of the decomposition of work are redrawn and redesigned by digital techniques which increase and depersonalize them the potential.

In 2005, Sergio Bellucci writes:

    «Taylor's triad meets Boole's and emerges distorted, reconfirmed and strengthened at least in the short term. Its structure changes with some changes that take on a permanent character. Parcelisation is re-thought as the possibility of joining the cycle wherever its pieces are located (de-spatialisation); cooperation takes place through a disjunction of work skills, flexibilised and isomorphized, through a qualitative leap towards the generalization of operations (computerization of growing slices of jobs and tasks); control through the denial of spaces of logic external to the production process which is, at the same time, a linguistic process that is learned through the new literacies produced by the process of consumption»[E-Work, 2005].

Digital Taylorism has the main characteristics of being standard, mechanistic, inflexible, and precise.

Management breaks down every task and standardizes an exact procedure that should be followed to complete that task.  In doing so it turns the overall job completion into a mechanistic, machine-like process.  Each worker is completing their task exactly as they have been instructed to by management, similar to a machine that has been programmed to perform a specific task in a specific way.  If something goes wrong with a worker, they are replaced just like a broken part in a machine.

The standard nature of Digital Taylorism provides for a certain level of precision.  Since everyone is operating in a predetermined way, it increases predictability and consistency while limiting error.  Through the use of different technologies, Digital Taylorism also allows management to more precisely monitor their subordinates to ensure maximum productivity.  While such standardization may increase precision, this type of inflexibility tends to inhibit creativity and growth within organizations.

Influences on the workplace
As a result of the continually changing workforce, Digital Taylorism can be found in many organizations. One example of this is grocery industry. In an Australian grocery store, the supplier, transporter, warehouse, and retailer all use Digital Taylorism to go about everyday tasks and monitor workers. The grocery store believes this is the best way to be the most efficient, least costly, and most productive. This particular grocery store refers to their methods as “computerized or New Taylorism”.

School systems are also using this method of New Taylorism to better the students and faculty. Schools are finding new ways to make sure students are being taught the most efficient methods in order to succeed and meet the standards. New Taylorism can be seen through the written curriculum in schools in the United States.

Another example of Digital Taylorism being used in the workplace is found in organizations who use surveillance systems to monitor workers and make sure they are on task at all times; the percentage of surveillance being used in the workplace is continually growing. Phones and computers that employees use at work are being monitored in order to make sure everything is being done in the most efficient way.  Workflow management system can be viewed as a form of Digital Taylorism. For instance, marketing automation can be integrated into customer relationship management to reduce and replace the need for human labour. Even so, such system or technologies are not meant to replace human work but instead designed to intuitively solve human needs, such that they can better focus on the bigger picture and the important aspects.

Criticisms 
The term 'Digital Taylorism' is multi-faceted and directly related to Taylorism. Therefore, due to some unfavorable perceptions of Taylorism, Digital Taylorism has some criticisms as well.  For example, Taylorism is infamous for meaningless work because employees are simply treated as machines. This may be shown in the deskilling of workers, though this is not always the case. Also, standards may be enforced much more strictly due to the technological advancements. This may be found in more stringent adherence of relaxation and meal breaks, reduced systemic overtime, and an increase in direct supervision. In turn, these leads to much more work measurement.  It is the opposite of what kinds of work environments that many organizations are currently adjusting to.
 
Digital Taylorism is criticized for giving management an extreme form of domination, therefore leading to repression in some circumstances. Every motion can be potentially watched, studied, and controlled by the boss. Already, 80% of the corporations in the United States have their employees under regular surveillance and this number is growing. For instance, in fields such as education, teachers may feel that the methods determined by the administration to standardize classes is because they are not capable of doing so themselves.  Students may be seen as the goods being produced, therefore losing the personal characteristics of classroom interactions and learning.  This has the potential to disempower and/or deskill the teachers. Digital Taylorism can be seen in standardized testing, which is common across America. 
 
Digital Taylorism also has its limitations. Based on Taylorism, most research concerning Digital Taylorism is simply based on time and motion studies to reveal improvement, rather than employee satisfaction. The results measured only involve quantitative methodologies. Though quantitative research is essential, it is not sufficient for providing the answers to questions concerning usability for example. Additionally, Digital Taylorism may be seen as overstepping its place for management. These new technologies may be crossing the line by intervening before anything results in significant industrial disputation. Instead, organizations are disciplining workers who simply do not meet the quota or standards.

References

Digital manufacturing
Organizational behavior
Organizational theory